The 2016 Agua da Serra Campeonato Brasileiro de Turismo (Brazilian Touring Championship), also known as Stock Car Brasil Light, is the fourth season of the Campeonato Brasileiro de Turismo, a second-tier series to Stock Car Brasil.

Teams and drivers
All cars were powered by V8 engines and used the JL chassis. All drivers were Brazilian-registered.

References

External links

Campeonato Brasileiro de Turismo
Stock Car Brasil